Giovanni Di Lorenzo  (born 4 August 1993) is an Italian professional footballer who plays as a right-back for  club Napoli, which he captains, and the Italy national team. A robust and aggressive defender, he is regarded as one of the best right-backs in the world.

Club career

Early career with Reggina and loan to Cuneo
Di Lorenzo began his career with the Reggina youth system in 2009. On 29 May 2011, he made his professional debut for the senior side in a Serie B match at Sassuolo. He spent the 2012–13 season on loan with Lega Pro Prima Divisione side Cuneo, collecting 27 appearances and drawing attention due to his promising performances.

Matera and Empoli
Between 2015 and 2017, Di Lorenzo played for Matera, collectiong 58 appearances and scoring 3 goals.

Di Lorenzo was signed by Empoli in August 2017. After helping the side achieve promotion to Serie A, he made his debut in the Italian top flight on 19 August 2018 against Cagliari; in the return fixture against the same opponent, he scored his first Serie A goal.

Napoli
On 7 June 2019, Di Lorenzo joined Napoli for €8 million. During his first year at Napoli, Di Lorenzo became a first team starter, taking them to seventh in the Serie A and helping them secure a win against Juventus in the Coppa Italia Final. Napoli also reached the Round of 16, in the Champions League, with Di Lorenzo getting 2 assists and playing every game. In his second year at the club, he helped guide the team into the Round of 32, at the Europa League, however, they lost to Granada, 3–2 on aggregate. Napoli also finished fifth in the league. Di Lorenzo has scored 7 goals for Napoli, in the League and Domestic Cups.

On 15 July 2020, the right-back was linked to a move with Manchester United, but instead opted to sign a 5 year deal with Napoli, seeing him remain at the club until 2026.

On 14 July 2022, Di Lorenzo was named the new Napoli club captain following the departures of Lorenzo Insigne and Kalidou Koulibaly.  On 4 October, he scored his first Champions League goal in a 6–1 away win over Ajax during the 2022–23 season.

International career
Di Lorenzo has represented Italy at U20 and U21 youth levels.

On 14 August 2013, Di Lorenzo made his debut with the Italy U21 national team under the guidance of coach and former Italian International footballer Luigi Di Biagio in a friendly match against Slovakia which Italy went on to win 4–1.

He made his senior international debut on 15 October 2019, playing as a starter in a 5–0 away win against Liechtenstein, in a UEFA Euro 2020 qualifying match.

In June 2021, he was included in Italy's 26-man squad for UEFA Euro 2020 by manager Roberto Mancini. After beating Belgium on July 2, Di Lorenzo gained notoriety by celebrating his victory by taking off his shorts and running around in his briefs. On 11 July, Di Lorenzo won the European Championship with Italy following a 3–2 penalty shoot-out victory over England at Wembley Stadium in the final, after a 1–1 draw in extra-time; during the final, Di Lorenzo played the entire match.

On 8 September, Di Lorenzo scored his first goal for the Italy senior national team, the final goal of 5–0 home win over Lithuania in 2022 FIFA World Cup qualifier; he had also contributed to Giacomo Raspadori's first goal for Italy, the third of the match.

Style of play
Initially a forward in his youth, Di Lorenzo was nicknamed "Batigol" by his friends due to his goal-scoring ability, in honour of Argentine striker Gabriel Omar Batistuta. He later switched to playing in more defensive roles and was occasionally deployed as a holding midfielder, before being moved to his current position of right-back. A versatile player, he is also capable of playing as a centre-back, an attack-minded wing-back or a right winger due to his offensive qualities. Although he is not the quickest player, Di Lorenzo is tall, possesses good technique, can play with both feet and is known for his stamina, physical qualities and ability in the air.

Personal life
Di Lorenzo was born in Castelnuovo di Garfagnana. On May 25, 2022 he married the Italian Clarissa Franchi in the church of Segromigno in Monte, in the province of Lucca.

Career statistics

Club

International

Scores and results list Italy's goal tally first, score column indicates score after each Di Lorenzo goal.

Honours
Empoli
 Serie B: 2017–18

Napoli
 Coppa Italia: 2019–20

Italy
 UEFA European Championship: 2020
UEFA Nations League third place: 2020–21

Individual
Serie A Team of the Year: 2021–22

Orders
  5th Class / Knight: Cavaliere Ordine al Merito della Repubblica Italiana: 2021

Notes

References

External links

Profile at the S.S.C. Napoli website
 
 
 
  Giovanni Di Lorenzo at AIC.football.it 
 Giovanni Di Lorenzo at Lega Serie A 
 Giovanni Di Lorenzo at TuttoCalciatori.net 

1993 births
Living people
Sportspeople from the Province of Lucca
Italian footballers
Italy youth international footballers
Italy under-21 international footballers
Italy international footballers
Association football defenders
Reggina 1914 players
A.C. Cuneo 1905 players
Matera Calcio players
Empoli F.C. players
S.S.C. Napoli players
Serie B players
Serie C players
Serie A players
UEFA Euro 2020 players
UEFA European Championship-winning players
Knights of the Order of Merit of the Italian Republic